Arayit Mountain is a mountain in the Eskişehir Range in central Turkey that rises approximately 300 meters above the surrounding landscape.

References 

Mountains of Turkey